Cliniodes iopolia is a moth in the family Crambidae. It was described by James E. Hayden in 2011. It is found in Peru, Ecuador and Colombia.

The length of the forewings is 17–18 mm for males and about 18 mm for females. The forewing costa is grey with violet-brown scales. The basal and medial areas are grey with scattered violet-brown or ruby scales. The hindwings are translucent white with a black marginal band. Adults have been recorded on wing in January, September and November.

Etymology
The species name is derived from Greek íov (meaning violet) the Greek word for grey.

References

Moths described in 2011
Eurrhypini